Kurt Schmücker (10 November 1919 – 6 January 1996) was a German politician, member of Christian Democratic Union (CDU).

Biography
Schmücker was born on 10 November 1919 in Löningen, in the Free State of Oldenburg.
In 1938, he ended a book printing course and started working in local newspapers. From 1940 to 1945, he served in the German infantry during World War II.

In 1937, Schmücker joined the Nazi Party. He joined the CDU in 1946. He represented Cloppenburg – Vechta in the German Federal Parliament from 1953 to 1972.

From 17 October 1963 to 30 November 1966, he served as minister for Economics and Technology. From 1966 to 1969 he served as minister for the Treasury.

References 

1919 births
1996 deaths
People from Cloppenburg (district)
People from the Province of Hanover
Nazi Party members
Economy ministers of Germany
Finance ministers of Germany
Government ministers of Germany
Members of the Bundestag for Lower Saxony
Members of the Bundestag 1969–1972
Members of the Bundestag 1965–1969
Members of the Bundestag 1961–1965
Members of the Bundestag 1957–1961
Members of the Bundestag 1953–1957
Members of the Bundestag 1949–1953
German Army personnel of World War II
Knights Commander of the Order of Merit of the Federal Republic of Germany
Members of the Bundestag for the Christian Democratic Union of Germany